Anthony Christopher Barry (7 June 1901 – 24 October 1983) was an Irish businessman and Fine Gael politician who served as a Teachta Dála (TD) for the Cork Borough constituency from 1961 to 1965 and 1954 to 1957. He was a Senator for the Cultural and Educational Panel from 1957 to 1961. He served as Lord Mayor of Cork from 1961 to 1962.

Early life and career
He was born the eldest among eleven children of James J. Barry, tea and wine merchant of Ballyhooly, County Cork, and Annie Barry (née Ryanh). His family had a small grocery business at Bridge Street in Cork. The firm specialised in teas and wines. The business later moved to Princes Street. It was awarded the Empire Cup for Tea Blending at the 1934 Grocers Exhibition in London. He spent his working life at the firm which was later developed under the tutelage of his son Peter into a major company called Barry's Tea.

He served with the National Army during the Irish Civil War, reaching the rank of captain.

Political career
Barry acted as election agent for W. T. Cosgrave, the former President of the Executive Council who was a Teachta Dála (TD) for Cork Borough from 1932 to 1944. Barry was elected to Dáil Éireann as TD for Cork Borough at the 1954 general election, but lost his seat at the 1957 general election and was then elected to the 9th Seanad on the Cultural and Educational Panel. He was re-elected to the Dáil at the 1961 general election, and served until a further defeat at the 1965 general election. He was also Lord Mayor of Cork from 1961 to 1962.

Family and personal life
Barry's son Peter won a seat in his old constituency in 1969, he was a Minister and briefly Tánaiste in the 1980s, and was succeeded as TD in 1997 by his daughter Deirdre Clune. Anthony Barry's daughter Theresa (Terry) Kelly served as Mayor of Limerick from 1983 to 1984.

Barry had an interest in photography from an early age and in his 50s his skill developed and apart from taking photographs he developed them at his home in York Terrace.

See also
Families in the Oireachtas

References

Sources
No Lovelier City, a Portrait of Cork by Anthony Barry, Mercier Press 2004 .  
RTÉ Radio interview with Deirdre Clune, 21 June 2006.

 

1901 births
1983 deaths
Local councillors in Cork (city)
Lord Mayors of Cork
Members of the 15th Dáil
Members of the 17th Dáil
Fine Gael TDs
Members of the 9th Seanad
Fine Gael senators
People educated at North Monastery